Pocopson is an unincorporated community in Pocopson Township in Chester County, Pennsylvania. Pocopson is located at the intersection of Pennsylvania Route 926 and Pocopson Road.

Former train station
Pocopson was once served by a train station that opened in 1890.

References

External links

Unincorporated communities in Chester County, Pennsylvania